Pickering is an English toponymic surname derived from the town Pickering, North Yorkshire.

People
 Adrienne Pickering (born 1981), Australian actress
 Alice Pickering (1860–1939), English tennis player
 Andrew Pickering, sociologist and science historian
 Bill Pickering (footballer, born 1901), English former footballer
 Calvin Pickering (born 1976), American baseball player
 Charles Pickering (disambiguation)
 Charlie Pickering (born 1977), Australian comedian
 Chip Pickering (born 1963), US Representative from Mississippi and son of Charles W. Pickering
 Christopher Pickering (MP) (c. 1556–1621), MP for Cumberland
 Chris Pickering, Australian alt.country musician
 Christopher Pickering (1842–1920), British businessman and philanthropist
 Craig Pickering (born 1986), British sprinter
 David Pickering (rugby union) (born 1960), former Wales international rugby union player
 David Pickering (writer) (born 1958), reference books compiler
 Donald Pickering (born 1933), English actor
 E. T. Pickering (1888–1961), American college baseball coach
 Edward Charles Pickering (1846–1919), astronomer
 Ernest Pickering (1928–2000), American fundamentalist leader
 Fred Pickering (1941–2019), English footballer
 Frederick Brian Pickering (1927–2017), British metallurgist
 George Pickering (disambiguation)
 Jack Pickering (1908–1977), English footballer
 James Pickering (died c. 1398), English politician
 James Pickering (rugby league) (born 1966), Fijian rugby league player
 Joanna Pickering British actress, writer, feminist, academic
 John Pickering (disambiguation)
 Karen Pickering (born 1971), champion British swimmer
 Kedrick Pickering, British Virgin Islands politician
 Larry Pickering (born 1942), Australian political cartoonist
 Liam Pickering (born 1968), Australian Rules footballer
 Lionel Pickering (1932–2006), English owner of Derby County football club
 Mick Pickering (born 1956), English former footballer
 Mike Pickering (born 1954), DJ
 Nick Pickering (born 1963), English footballer
 Philip D. Pickering (born 1948), Baron of Newton
 Rex Pickering, (1936–2017), New Zealand rugby union player
 Ron Pickering (1930–2014), English athletics coach and commentator
 Percival Spencer Umfreville Pickering (1858–1920), British chemist and horticulturist
 Samuel Pickering (born 1941), English professor on whom was based the character John Keating in the film Dead Poets Society
 Shaun Pickering (born 1961), Welsh shot putter
 Thomas Pickering (martyr) (1621–1679), English Benedictine lay brother and martyr
 Thomas G. Pickering (1940–2009), British physician and professor of medicine
 Thomas R. Pickering (born 1931), American politician
 Tom Pickering (footballer) (1906-?), English footballer
 Timothy Pickering (1745–1829), third Secretary of State of the United States, Postmaster General and politician
 William Pickering (disambiguation), several people

Fictional characters
 Colonel Hugh Pickering, in the play Pygmalion by George Bernard Shaw and its various adaptations
 Charles Pickering, the villain of the novella "The Gingerbread Girl" by Stephen King
 Nina Pickering, a lead character in the British television series Being Human

See also
 Justice Pickering (disambiguation)
 Senator Pickering (disambiguation)

English-language surnames
English toponymic surnames